The Umpqua Group is a geologic group in Oregon. It preserves fossils dating back to the Paleogene period.

See also

 List of fossiliferous stratigraphic units in Oregon
 Paleontology in Oregon

References
 

Paleogene geology of Oregon